Steel Human is the fourth mixtape by American rapper NoCap. It was released on July 16, 2020, by Atlantic Records and Never Broke Again. It features guest appearances from DaBaby, Boosie Badazz, Lil Uzi Vert, and Jacquees. It is the follow-up to his first two solo releases, The Backend Child (2019) and The Hood Dictionary (2019), as well as the collaboration mixtape Rogerville (2019) with fellow rapper Rylo Rodriguez. The project debuted at number 31 on the US Billboard 200.

Promotion

Singles 
The one and only lead single, "Count a Million" featuring American rapper Lil Uzi Vert, was released on June 16, 2020.

Music videos 
The music video for the song "By Tonight", was released on June 22, 2020. The music video for the song "Radar", premiered on July 22, 2020. The music video for the song "Overtime", was released on September 15, 2020.

Commercial performance 
On July 27, 2020, Steel Human debuted at number 31 on the US Billboard 200, which became NoCap's third chart entry on the chart. The project also debuted at number 18 on the US Top R&B/Hip-Hop Albums, and debuted at number 17 on the US Top Rap Albums.

Track listing 
Credits adapted from Genius, Spotify, and Tidal.

Notes
  signifies a co-producer
  signifies an additional producer

Personnel 
Credits adapted from Genius and Tidal.

Vocals
NoCap – primary artist (all tracks)
DaBaby – featured artist (track 4)
Boosie Badazz – featured artist (track 6)
Lil Uzi Vert – featured artist (track 8)
Jacquees – featured artist (track 11)

Production
VenoTheBuilder – producer (track 1)
Al Geno – producer (tracks 2–6, 8, 10)
StringzOnTheBeat – producer (track 2)
Yung Lan – producer (track 2)
Benjamin Lasnier – producer (track 3)
LukasBL – producer (track 3)
Young Grind – co-producer (track 5)
LenoxBeatmaker – additional producer (track 5)
CashMoneyAP – producer (tracks 7, 13)
LayZ Beats – co-producer (track 7, 13)
Yung Tago – producer (track 8)
G5 – producer (tracks 9, 12)
Greg Sekeres – producer (track 9)
XTT – producer (track 10)
youngkimj – producer (track 10, 14)
Lang On Lead – producer (track 11)
ProdByKel – producer (track 11)
Cash Flow – producer (track 12)
Mook On The Beats – producer (track 12)
Bass Charity – producer (track 15)
Jambo – producer (track 15)
LastHaze – producer (track 16)
LMK – producer (track track 16)
Audio Jacc – producer (track 16)

Technical
Al Geno – mixer (tracks 1–3, 5, 7, 9–16)
Chris Athens – masterer (all track)
Dan Weston – mixer (tracks 4, 6, 8)

Programming
VenoTheBuilder – programmer (track 1)
Al Geno – programmer (tracks 2–6, 8, 10)
StringzOnTheBeat – programmer (track 2)
Yung Lan – programmer (track 2)
Benjamin Lasnier – programmer (track 3)
LukasBL – programmer (track 3)
Young Grind – programmer (track 5)
LenoxBeatmaker – programmer (track 5)
CashMoneyAP – programmer (tracks 7, 13)
LayZ Beats – programmer (track 7, 13)
Yung Tago – programmer (track 8)
G5 – programmer (tracks 9, 12)
Greg Sekeres – programmer (track 9)
XTT – programmer (track 10)
youngkimj – programmer (track 10, 14)
Lang On Lead – programmer (track 11)
ProdByKel – programmer (track 11)
Cash Flow – programmer (track 12)
Mook On The Beats – programmer (track 12)
Bass Charity – programmer (track 15)
Jambo – programmer (track 15)
LastHaze – programmer (track 16)
LMK – programmer (track track 16)
Audio Jacc – programmer (track 16)

Charts

References 

Atlantic Records albums
Southern hip hop albums
Hip hop albums by American artists
2020 mixtape albums